Catephia sospita is a species of moth of the family Erebidae first described by James Farish Malcolm Fawcett in 1916. It is found in Kenya.

References

Fawcett, J. M. (1916). "Notes on a collection of Heterocera made by Mr. W. Feather in British East Africa, 1911–13". Proceedings of the Zoological Society of London. 2: 707–737, pl. 1.

External links
 

Endemic moths of Kenya
Catephia
Moths described in 1916
Moths of Africa